Nabakumari Devi is an Indian politician. She was elected to the Odisha Legislative Assembly   as a member of the Indian National Congress.

References

Living people
Indian National Congress politicians
Women in Odisha politics
Year of birth missing (living people)
Odisha MLAs 1967–1971